The Mount Ilgaz National Park is a protected area established on June 2, 1976 and located on the Ilgaz Mountains at the borderline between Kastamonu Province and Çankırı Province in the western Black Sea Region of Turkey.

Geology
The terrain structure of the Mount Ilgaz region, which is on the transient zone from Central Anatolia to North Anatolia, is characterized in general by serpentinite, schist and volcanic rock. There are also interesting examples in the region regarding mountain formation. Turkey's longest and most active geological fracture, the North Anatolian Fault, runs through the southern foot of Mount Ilgaz. The entire region features valleys, slopes and peaks of different characters. Additionally, it has geomorphological structure with a high-level landscape speciality.

Geography

The national park is on the Ilgaz Mountains, a mountain range in the western Black Sea Region. The mountains are bordered in the north by Gökırmak River and in the south by Devrez Creek, forming the hydrographic boundary between the two river basins. The Gökırmak River originates in the northern slopes of the Ilgaz Mountains, and flows in the west–east direction joining Kızılırmak River as one of its main tributaries. Devrez Creek follows the North Anatolian Fault joining also Kızılırmak in the east.

Climate
Precipitation is highest in spring and early
summer. The north facing slopes of the higher regions receive relative more rainfall.

Ecosystem

 
 
 
Thanks to the location of the national park in the transient region between Central Anatolia and Black Sea Region, the national park has a rich ecosystem of flora and fauna.

Flora
Forests, covering 81.7% of the total area, are the main vegetation group found in the national park's flora formation consisting of forest, underwood and alpine flora in general. The low altitude parts of the northern slopes are generally covered with Turkey oak (Quercus cerris), European black pine (Pinus nigra) and fir (Abies) forests. This zone is rich of endemic flora found in northern Turkey. On the summit of Küçükhacettepe and Büyükhacettepe, which is the highest peak, numerous rare and endemic taxa are found.
	
Fauna
It is believed that some 30 mammals are found in and around the Ilgaz Mountains. Abundant and all-year-long running streams as well as rich vegetation enable well-matched conditions for the habitat of fauna such as deer (Cervidae), roe deer (Capreolus capreolus), wild boar (Sus scrofa), grey wolf (Canis lupus), brown bear (Ursus arctos), red fox (Vulpes vulpes), wildcat (Felis silvestris), lynx, European pine marten (Martes martes), beech marten (Martes foina), weasel, rabbit, squirrel, hedgehog, mole, bat, European badger (Meles meles) and European otter (Lutra lutra''). Studies showed the existence of 617 taxa in and around the national park.

Recreation

Mount Ilgaz National Park offers opportunities for diverse outdoor sports including hiking, camping and caravaning as well as daily activities. Angling at fishponds situated on Karasu stream in Baldıran Valley is possible between June 15 and September 15. Visitors can also buy trout throughout the year from fish hatcheries in the same area.

Another important feature of the national park is its potential for winter sports, which is performed at the site since the 1990s. The ski resort attracts visitors from Istanbul and Ankara. The nearest ski resort to Ankara is situated in the national park, called "Ankara Konağı" ("Ankara Lodge").

Access
The national park is situated on the state road  between Çankırı and Kastamonu, which runs from Ankara to Black Sea coast northwards.

Catering and lodging
To meet the catering and lodging needs of the visitors, the national park consists of a holiday village, social facilities and a hotel, all situated within Kastamonu Province side of the province borderline. In addition, there are accommodation facilities belonging to various public institutions. Ilgaz Mountain Resort offers 118 suites having 446 beds. The total lodging capacity at the national park is 666.

References

National parks of Turkey
Protected areas established in 1976
1976 establishments in Turkey
Geography of Kastamonu Province
Geography of Çankırı Province
Tourist attractions in Kastamonu Province
Tourist attractions in Çankırı Province
Ski areas and resorts in Turkey